Marcus Junius Brutus (died 77 BC) was a plebeian tribune of the Roman Republic in 83 BC and the founder of the colony in Capua. He was an associate of Marcus Aemilius Lepidus, who led a revolt against the senate after the death of Sulla. He was captured by Pompey and treacherously executed. He was the father of his homonymous son, who assassinated Julius Caesar in 44.

Biography 

He served as tribune of the plebs in 83 BC. During his year, he passed a bill establishing a colony at Capua.

In 77 BC, Brutus was stationed, probably as a legate, under Lepidus in Cisalpine Gaul. He was allied with Marcus Aemilius Lepidus, who as consul was agitating against Sulla's constitutional settlement and opposed a state funeral for the dictator after his death. He also "took up the cause of those who had lost their civil or political rights under Sulla's reforms". Lepidus turned to violence and raised an army against his consular colleague Quintus Lutatius Catulus when Catulus successfully blocked constitutional reform.

Lepidus' army was defeated outside of Rome by Catulus' forces. Some sources assert that Pompey or both Catulus and Pompey were responsible, but the most reliable narratives mention Catulus only. Brutus was stationed at Mutina, where he defended the stronghold against Pompey, who had been sent by the senate to dislodge him. He withstood Pompey's attacks for some time, but was eventually surrendered – his troops either turned on him or he surrendered of his own accord – after which he was allowed to go free.  Following this, he went to the town of Regium Lepidi, where he was murdered by Pompey's close ally Geminius. According to Plutarch,

For Brutus, whether he himself betrayed his army, or whether his army changed sides and betrayed him, put himself in the hands of Pompey, and receiving an escort of horsemen, retired to a little town upon the Po. Here, after a single day had passed, he was slain by Geminius, who was sent by Pompey to do the deed.

Pompey forwarded to Rome the news of his surrender and execution. The senate blamed Pompey for the perfidious act. John Leach, in his biography of Pompey, defends his subject by arguing that Brutus "presumably began to whip up further support for Lepidus (the name of the town suggests that there were hereditary clients of his there)" and so Pompey was "forced" to send Geminius to Regium Lepidi to recapture and execute him. The incident would later be used a anti-Pompeian propaganda to brand the general as a "teenaged butcher".

Brutus is quoted by Cicero, who says he was well skilled in public and private law.

Family 
He was the first husband to Servilia, the elder half-sister of Cato the Younger. His homonymous son by Servilia is the Marcus Junius Brutus who was one of the chief assassins of Julius Caesar.

See also
 Junia gens
 Servilia, his wife
 Marcus Junius Brutus, his homonymous son

References
Citations

Sources

 
 
 
 
 
 

77 BC deaths
1st-century BC Romans
Ancient Roman murder victims
Family of Marcus Junius Brutus
Family of Servilia (mother of Brutus)
Marcus
Tribunes of the plebs